The South African National Defence Force's rank system is largely based on the British system, with the Air Force (and later the Military Health Service) sharing the Army rank titles. Rank titles changed over time as did the insignia.

Evolution of rank titles

Army and Air Force ranks

General officers
 Field marshal (1923–c1950)
 General (1914– ) (called "commandant-general" 1956–68)
 Lieutenant-general (1914– )
 Major-general (1914– ) (called "combat general" 1960–68)
 Brigadier-general (1912–40, 1998– )

Field officers
 Brigadier (1937–98) (called "colonel-commandant" 1937–40)
 Colonel (1912– )
 Chief commandant (Used in the Commandos 1968–70)
 Lieutenant-colonel (1912– ) (called "commandant" 1950–94)

Company / junior officers
 Major (1912– )
 Captain (1912– )
 Lieutenant (1912– ) (called "field cornet" 1960–68)
 Second lieutenant (1918– ) (called "assistant field cornet" 1960–68)

Warrant officers

In June 2008 a new series of warrant officer ranks were introduced.
 Warrant officer 1st class (1921– )
 Warrant officer 2nd class (1921– )
 Warrant officer (1912–21)

Non-commissioned officers
 Staff sergeant (1912– ) (Air Force equivalent "flight sergeant")
 Sergeant (1912– ) (Air Force equivalent called "air sergeant" until 1970)
 Corporal (1912– ) (Air Force equivalent called "air corporal" until 1970)
 Lance-corporal (1912– ) (Air Force equivalent called "leading air mechanic" until 1970)

Rank and file
 Private (1912– ) (Air Force equivalent called "air mechanic" 1920–70, "private" 1970–82 and "airman" 1982–)

Naval ranks

Flag officers
 Admiral (1972– )
 Vice-admiral (1965– )
 Rear-admiral (1940– )
 Rear-admiral junior grade (1998– )

Senior officers
 Commodore (1946–98)
 Captain (1941– )
 Commander (1913– )
 Lieutenant-commander (1913– )

Junior officers
 Lieutenant (1913– )
 Sub-lieutenant (1913– )
 Ensign (1913– ) (called "acting sub-lieutenant" until 1965)
 Warrant officer 1st class (1955– )
 Warrant officer 2nd class (1955– )
 Warrant officer (1913–55)

Petty officers
 Chief petty officer (1913– )
 Petty officer (1913– )
 Leading seaman (1913– )
 Able seaman (1913– )

Ratings
 Seaman (1913– )

1928–1953 rank structure

Officers

Other ranks

1961–1994 rank structure

During the apartheid era, the South African Army's rank structure was shared between the Army, Air Force and SAMS with some small differences. In the Air Force a staff sergeant was a flight sergeant for example. The Air Force ranks had a blue background and the NCO stripes were blue. For SAMS the ranks had a maroon background.

Officers

Other ranks

Note: in the artillery and anti-aircraft corps, the corporal and lance-corporal are called "bombardier" and "lance-bombardier". The private is called a "gunner" in the artillery and anti-aircraft, a "rifleman" in the infantry, a "trooper" in the armoured corps, a "sapper" in the engineers, a "signalman" in the signals corps, and a "scout" in the intelligence corps.

Substantive warrant officer posts

Any warrant officer class 1 could be posted to substantive posts, including
 Regimental sergeant major
 Command sergeant major
 Brigade sergeant major
 Sergeant Major of the Army
 Sergeant Major of the Air Force

However they would retain the rank of WO1, while wearing unique rank insignia. To distinguish the posting different colour backgrounds were used; for example, red for regimental sergeant major and black for command sergeant major. The sergeant major of each arm of service wore insignia topped by the arms of their respective arm of service.

In 2008 the warrant officer ranks were expanded to make each substantive rank a formal rank.

Army

The SA Army was formed in 1912 as the Union Defence Force. It was given its present name in 1951. The rank system is derived from that of the British Army.

The ranks of General Officers changed in September 2003 when the rank previously called Brigadier became known as Brigadier General.

Officers

Warrant officers

Other ranks

Air Force

The SA Air Force was formed in 1920. Unlike many other Commonwealth air forces, it had an army style rank system. In 2002 the Air Force officer rank insignia structure was changed from one which was shared with the Army to a new pattern based on stripes. The Air Force stated that this was "in order to bring it more in line with international forms of rank". The army-style rank titles were retained. Note: The rank of General is only used when the Chief of the Air Force is also the Chief of the Defence Force which has occurred on occasion in the past. In 2005 the South African Air Force redesigned its insignia completely, while keeping the Army titles.

Officers

Warrant officers

Other ranks

Navy

The SA Navy was originally two separate organisations, namely the South African Division of the Royal Navy Volunteer Reserve (formed in 1913) and the South African Naval Service (formed in 1922 and renamed the "Seaward Defence Force" in 1939). They amalgamated in 1942 to form the SA Naval Forces, which were renamed "SA Navy" in 1951. The rank system is based on that of the (British) Royal Navy.

The ranks of flag officers changed in 1997 when the rank previously called Commodore became known as Rear Admiral (Junior Grade).

Officers

Warrant Officers

Enlisted

Military Health Service

The South African Military Health Service uses the Army rank system. There is a differentiation in that the rank insignia is displayed on a red background as opposed to the Army, which is displayed on an olive background.

Officers

Enlisted

Master Chief and Senior Chief Warrant Officers

The highest ranking South African non-commissioned officer is the Warrant Officer of the South African National Defence Force. They are the sole holder of the rank of Master Chief Warrant Officer (NATO equivalent WO-5). As of October 2012 the incumbent MCWO is Mothusi Kgaladi

The rank of Senior Chief Warrant Officer (NATO equivalent WO-4) is only held by the Master at Arms of the Navy, the Sergeant Major of the Army, the Sergeant Major of the Air Force, and the Sergeant Major of the Military Health Service.

See also

 Comparative military ranks
 Comparative military ranks of apartheid states in southern Africa
 List of badges of the South African Army
 Military rank

Notes

References

 
Military of South Africa
South Africa and the Commonwealth of Nations